The 1895–96 season was the third season in which Dundee competed at a Scottish national level, playing in Division One, finishing in 5th place. Dundee would also compete in the Scottish Cup.

Scottish Division One 

Statistics provided by Dee Archive

League table

Scottish Cup 

Statistics provided by Dee Archive

Player Statistics 
Statistics provided by Dee Archive

|}

See also 

 List of Dundee F.C. seasons

References 

 

Dundee F.C. seasons
Dundee